This is a list of the National Register of Historic Places listings in Canyonlands National Park.

This is intended to be a complete list of the properties and districts on the National Register of Historic Places in Canyonlands National Park, Utah, United States.  The locations of National Register properties and districts for which the latitude and longitude coordinates are included below, may be seen in a Google map.

There are 11 properties and districts listed on the National Register in the park.

Current listings 

|}

See also 
 National Register of Historic Places listings in Grand County, Utah
 National Register of Historic Places listings in Wayne County, Utah
 National Register of Historic Places listings in San Juan County, Utah
 National Register of Historic Places listings in Garfield County, Utah
 National Register of Historic Places listings in Utah

References 
National Register of Historic Places Registration Form: Canyonlands National Park Multiple Resource. National Park Service 1988 

Canyonlands National Park